Epiblema rimosana is a species of moth of the family Tortricidae. It is found in China, Korea, Japan and Russia (South Siberian Mountains).

References

Moths described in 1882
Eucosmini